Rankine is a surname. Notable people with the surname include:
 William Rankine (1820–1872), Scottish engineer and physicist
 Rankine body an elliptical shape of significance in fluid dynamics, named for Rankine
 Rankine scale, an absolute-temperature scale related to the Fahrenheit scale, named for Rankine
 Rankine cycle, a thermodynamic heat-engine cycle, also named after Rankine
 Rankine Lecture, a lecture delivered annually by an expert in the field of geotechnics
 Alan Rankine (born 1958), Scottish rock musician
 Alexander Rankine (1881–1956), British physicist
 Andy Rankine (1895–1965), Scottish footballer
 Camille Rankine, American poet
 Claudia Rankine (born 1963), American poet and playwright
 Dean Rankine, Australian comics artist
 George Rankine Irwin, (1907–1998) American materials scientist
 James Rankine (1828–1897), South Australian politician
 Jennifer Rankine (born 1953), South Australian politician
 John Rankine (1918–2013), British science fiction author
 John Rankine (politician) (1801–1864), South Australian physician and politician
 John Rankine (governor) (1907–1987), British colonial administrator
 Mark Rankine (born 1969), English footballer
 Michael Rankine (born 1985), English footballer
 Scotty Rankine (1909–1995), Canadian Olympic athlete
 William Rankine Milligan, Lord Milligan (1898–1975), Scottish judge and politician

See also
 Organic Rankine cycle
 Rankin (disambiguation)
 Rankine (crater)
 Rankine power station
 Rankine theory
 Rankine vortex
 Rankine's method
 Rankine–Hugoniot equation
 Trouton–Rankine experiment